Carlmann Kolb (29 January 1703 – 15 January 1765) was a German priest, organist, and composer.

He was born in Kösslarn, Griesbach, Lower Bavaria, and educated in Asbach  and Landshut. He was ordained a priest in 1729 at the Benedictine , and was also appointed organist there. He acted as tutor to the family of the Count of Tattenbach-Reinstein in Munich, and received his patronage. He died in Munich.

His known works are the Sinfonia in F major for harpsichord and strings, which is lost, and the Certamen aonium (Augsburg, 1733), composed of a prelude, three verses in the form of short fughettas and a cadenza on each of the church modes. The style shows influence by Franz Xaver Murschhauser and Gottlieb Muffat. Modern editions have been published in Altötting, 1959, ed. R. Walter, and Heidelberg, 1960.

External links

Sources

Hugh J. McLean, "Kolb, Carlmann", Grove Music Online ed. L. Macy (Accessed 2007-06-10)

1703 births
1765 deaths
People from Passau (district)
German Baroque composers
German classical organists
18th-century German Roman Catholic priests
Organists and composers in the South German tradition
German male organists
German Benedictines
18th-century classical composers
18th-century keyboardists
German classical composers
German male classical composers
18th-century German composers
18th-century German male musicians
Male classical organists